The Church of Nuestra Señora de la Peña de Faido is a church in Faido, Peñacerrada-Urizaharra, Basque Country, Spain. It was declared Bien de Interés Cultural in 1984 and Monument by the Basque Government in 2003. The church is partially located in an artificial cave.

References

External links
 

Bien de Interés Cultural landmarks in Álava
Cave churches
Churches in Álava